Verot may refer to:

Alternate name for Bastardo (grape)
Augustin Verot (1804–1876), French-born American Roman Catholic bishop
Darcy Verot (born 1976), Canadian ice hockey player